Corbola is a comune (municipality) in the Province of Rovigo in the Italian region Veneto, located about  southwest of Venice and about  southeast of Rovigo.

Corbola borders the following municipalities: Adria, Ariano nel Polesine, Papozze, Taglio di Po.

References

External links
 Official website

Cities and towns in Veneto